A seedbox is a high-bandwidth remote server for uploading and downloading of digital files from a P2P network. The bandwidth ranges generally from 100 Mbit/s to 20 Gbit/s. After the seedbox has acquired the files, people with access to the seedbox can download the file to their personal computers.

Function
Seedboxes generally use the BitTorrent protocol, although they have also been used on the eDonkey2000 network. Seedboxes are usually connected to a high-speed network, often with a throughput of 100 Mbit/s or even 1 Gbit/s. Some providers are testing and offering 10 Gbit/s shared servers, while others are developing other systems that will allow users to scale their needs on the fly. Once the seedbox has a full copy of the files, they can be downloaded at high speeds to a user's personal computer via the HTTP, FTP, SFTP, or rsync protocols. This allows for anonymity and, usually, removes the need to worry about share ratio. More expensive seedboxes may support VNC or Remote Desktop Protocol, allowing many popular clients to be run remotely. Other seedboxes are special-purpose and run a variety of torrent-specific software including web interfaces of popular clients like Transmission, rTorrent, Deluge, and μTorrent, as well as the TorrentFlux web interface clients. Mobile interface support is also offered by clients such as Transmission.

Seedboxes on high-speed networks are typically able to download large files within minutes, provided that the swarm can actually handle such a high upload bandwidth. Seedboxes generally have download and upload speeds of 100 Mbit/s. This means that a 1 GB file can finish downloading in under half a minute. That same 1 GB file can be uploaded to other users in the same amount of time, creating a 1:1 share ratio for that individual file. The ability to transfer files so quickly makes them very attractive to the P2P communities. Because of the mentioned high speeds, seedboxes tend to be popular when using private torrent trackers, where maintaining an share ratio above 1 can be very important.

Seedboxes are also used to circumvent bandwidth throttling by Internet service providers or to evade laws such as the HADOPI law in France.

References

File sharing networks
File sharing